Prionapteryx albiceps is a moth in the family Crambidae. It was described by George Hampson in 1919. It is found in South Africa, where it has been recorded from the Western Cape.

References

Ancylolomiini
Moths described in 1919
Endemic moths of South Africa